Charles George Merewether (1823 – 26 June 1884) was a Conservative Party politician.

Hamond first stood for election in Northampton in 1868, but was unsuccessful. He was again unsuccessful at the 1874 election, but gained the seat at a by-election shortly after. However, he was beaten again in 1880.

References

External links
 

Conservative Party (UK) MPs for English constituencies
UK MPs 1874–1880
1823 births
1884 deaths